Christopher John Baker (born 9 July 1958), Australian politician, is a member of the Liberal Party, a solicitor, and was a Member of the Western Australian Legislative Assembly (1996–2001) and City of Joondalup councillor (2001–2004). He is currently a City of Wanneroo Councillor.

Baker was born in Brisbane and moved to Western Australia in 1989. Prior to entering parliament as the member for the newly created seat of Joondalup, he was a barrister, solicitor and proprietor of a law firm. Baker also served as a Councillor in the Town of Port Hedland from 1994–1996.

In parliament, he was involved in a number of committees, including the Public Accounts Committee. He lost the seat at the February 2001 state election to his Labor rival, Tony O'Gorman.

On 5 May 2001, Baker was elected as councillor for the Marina ward of Joondalup with an overwhelming majority of votes. He was one of a group of councillors who supported the controversial CEO, Denis Smith, and was criticised by the inquiry into the City of Joondalup by lawyer Greg McIntyre.

Baker's career as a solicitor has involved practicing law in Darwin, Katherine and Esperance in the late 1980s, and later as proprietor of law firm Chris Baker and Associates. Baker is a Notary Public from the Supreme Court of WA.

On 19 October 2019, Baker was elected as a Councillor at the City of Wanneroo for the North Coast Ward, defeating incumbent Russell Driver by 5.82%, or 1,131 votes, and secured 3.25% more votes than incumbent Natalie Sangalli, who was re-elected to the second vacant position.

References

External links
Report of the Inquiry into the City of Joondalup (4MB PDF)
 - includes Baker's response.
https://www.parliament.wa.gov.au/parliament/library/MPHistoricalData.nsf/(Lookup)/F82D5BE810DCFEEA482577E50028A50C?OpenDocument
https://www.elections.wa.gov.au/elections/local/election#/156FE5B8-E78B-4A62-BBA7-A31896E9103E/Wanneroo

1958 births
Living people
Liberal Party of Australia members of the Parliament of Western Australia
Notaries
Politicians from Perth, Western Australia
21st-century Australian politicians
20th-century Australian politicians
Western Australian local councillors